Giles David Puckle (born 24 March 1979) is an English cricketer.  Puckle is a right-handed batsman who bowled slow left-arm orthodox.  He was born at Epsom, Surrey.

Puckle represented the Surrey Cricket Board in a single List A match against Lincolnshire in the 2nd round of the 2002 Cheltenham & Gloucester Trophy which was played in 2001.  In his only List A match, he scored 5 runs and took 2 wickets at a bowling average of 23.00, with figures of 2/46.

He currently plays club cricket for Malden Wanderers Cricket Club in the Surrey Championship.

References

External links
Giles Puckle at Cricinfo
Giles Puckle at CricketArchive

1979 births
Living people
Cricketers from Epsom
People from Surrey
English cricketers
Surrey Cricket Board cricketers